Simulcast (a portmanteau of simultaneous broadcast) is the broadcasting of programmes/programs or events across more than one resolution, bitrate or medium, or more than one service on the same medium, at exactly the same time (that is, simultaneously). For example, Absolute Radio is simulcast on both AM and on satellite radio. Likewise, the BBC's Prom concerts were formerly simulcast on both BBC Radio 3 and BBC Television. Another application is the transmission of the original-language soundtrack of movies or TV series over local or Internet radio, with the television broadcast having been dubbed into a local language.

Early radio simulcasts
Before launching stereo radio, experiments were conducted by transmitting left and right channels on different radio channels.  The earliest record found was a broadcast by the BBC in 1926 of a Halle Orchestra concert from Manchester, using the wavelengths of the regional stations and Daventry.

In its earliest days the BBC often transmitted the same programme on the "National Service" and the "Regional Network".

An early use of the word "simulcast" is from 1925.

Between 1990 and 1994 the BBC broadcast a channel of entertainment (Radio 5) which offered a wide range of simulcasts, taking programmes from the BBC World Service and Radio 1, 2, 3 and 4 for simultaneous broadcast.

Simulcasting to provide stereo sound for TV broadcasts
Before stereo TV sound transmission was possible, simulcasting on TV and radio was a method of effectively transmitting "stereo" sound to music TV broadcasts. Typically, an FM frequency in the broadcast area for viewers to tune their stereo systems to would be displayed on the screen. The band Grateful Dead and their concert "Great Canadian Train Ride" in 1970 was the first TV broadcast of a live concert with FM simulcast. In the 1970s WPXI in Pittsburgh broadcast a live Boz Scaggs performance which had the audio simultaneously broadcast on two FM radio stations to create a quadrophonic sound, the first of its kind. The first such transmission in the United Kingdom was on 14 November 1972, when the BBC broadcast a live classical concert from the Royal Albert Hall on both BBC2 and Radio 3. The first pop/rock simulcast was almost two years later, a recording of Van Morrison's London Rainbow Concert simultaneously on BBC2 TV and Radio 2 (see It's Too Late to Stop Now) on 27 May 1974.

Similarly, in the 1980s, before Multichannel Television Sound or home theater was commonplace in American households, broadcasters would air a high fidelity version of a television program's audio portion over FM stereo simultaneous with the television broadcast. PBS stations were the most likely to use this technique, especially when airing a live concert. It was also a way of allowing MTV and similar music channels to run stereo sound through the cable-TV network. This method required a stereo FM transmitter modulating MTV's stereo soundtrack through the cable-TV network, and customers connecting their FM receiver's antenna input to the cable-TV outlet. They would then tune the FM receiver to the specified frequency that would be published in documentation supplied by the cable-TV provider.

With the introduction of commercial FM stations in Australia in July 1980, commercial TV channels began simulcasting some music based programs with the new commercial FM stations and continued to do so into the early 1990s.  These were initially rock based programs, such as late night music video shows and rock concerts, but later included some major rock musicals such as The Rocky Horror Picture Show and The Blues Brothers when they first aired on TV. During the mid-1980s the final Australian concert of several major rock artists such as Dire Straits were simulcast live on a commercial TV and FM station.  The ABC also simulcast some programs on ABC Television and ABC FM, including the final concert of Elton John with the Melbourne Symphony Orchestra.

In South Africa, the SABC radio station Radio 2000 was established in 1986 to simulcast SABC 1 programming, especially imported American and British television shows, in their original English, before South Africa adopted a stereo standard which allowed secondary audio tracks through the television spectrum.

The first cable TV concert simulcast was Frank Zappa's Halloween show (31 October 1981), live from NYC's Palladium and shown on MTV with the audio-only portion simulcast over FM's new "Starfleet Radio" network. Engineered by Mark G. Pinske with the UMRK mobile recording truck. A later, notable application for simulcasting in this context was the Live Aid telethon concert that was broadcast around the world on 13 July 1985. Most destinations where this concert was broadcast had the concert simulcast by at least one TV network and at least one of the local FM stations.

Most stereo-capable video recorders made through the 1980s and early 1990s had a "simulcast" recording mode where they recorded video signals from the built-in TV tuner and audio signals from the VCR's audio line-in connectors. This was to allow one to connect a stereo FM tuner that is tuned to the simulcast frequency to the VCR's audio input in order to record the stereo sound of a TV program that would otherwise be recorded in mono. The function was primarily necessary with stereo VCRs that didn't have a stereo TV tuner or were operated in areas where stereo TV broadcasting wasn't in place. This was typically selected through the user setting the input selector to "Simulcast" or "Radio" mode or, in the case of some JVC units, the user setting another "audio input" switch from "TV" or "Tuner" to "Line".

In the mid to late 1990s, video game developer Nintendo utilized simulcasting to provide enhanced orchestral scoring and voice-acting for the first ever "integrated radio-games" – its Satellaview video games. Whereas digital game data was broadcast to the Satellaview unit to provide the basic game and game sounds, Nintendo's partner, satellite radio company St.GIGA, simultaneously broadcast the musical and vocal portion of the game via radio. These two streams were combined at the Satellaview to provide a unified audiotrack analogous to stereo.

Other uses
The term "simulcast" (describing simultaneous radio/television broadcast) was coined in 1948 by a press agent at WCAU-TV, Philadelphia. NBC and CBS had begun broadcasting a few programs both to their established nationwide radio audience and to the much smaller—though steadily-growing—television audience. NBC's "Voice of Firestone" is sometimes mentioned in this regard, but NBC's "Voice of Firestone Televues" program, reaching a small Eastern audience beginning in 1943, was a TV-only show, distinct from the radio "Voice of Firestone" broadcasts. Actual TV-AM radio simulcasts of the very same "Voice of Firestone" program began only on 5 September 1949. A documented candidate for first true simulcast may well be NBC's "We the People." Toscanini's NBC Symphony performance of 15 March 1952 is perhaps a first instance of radio/TV simulcasting of a concert, predating the much-heralded rock concert simulcasts beginning in the 1980s. It could, however, be argued that these Toscanini presentations—with admission controlled by NBC, as with all its programming—were no more "public concerts" than NBC's "Voice of Firestone" broadcasts beginning in 1949, or its "Band of America" programs, which were simulcast starting 17 October 1949. Likewise Toscanini's simulcast NBC presentation of two acts of Verdi's "Aida" on 3 April 1949.

Presently, in the United States, simulcast most often refers to the practice of offering the same programming on an FM and AM station owned by the same entity, in order to cut costs. With the advent of solid state AM transmitters and computers, it has become very easy for AM stations to broadcast a different format without additional cost; therefore, simulcast between FM/AM combinations are rarely heard today outside of rural areas, and in urban areas, where often the talk or all-news radio format of an AM station is simulcast on FM, mainly for the convenience of office buildings in urban cores which easily block AM signals.

During apartheid in South Africa, many foreign programmes on SABC television were dubbed in Afrikaans. The original soundtrack, usually in English, but sometimes in German or Dutch was available on the Radio 2000 service. This could be selected using a button labeled simulcast on many televisions manufactured before 1995.

Radio programs have been simulcast on television since the invention thereof however, as of recent, perhaps the most visible example of radio shows on television is The Howard Stern Show, which currently airs on Sirius Satellite Radio as well as Howard TV. Another prominent radio show that was simulcast on television is Imus in the Morning, which until the simulcast ended in 2015, aired throughout the years on MSNBC, RFD-TV and Fox Business Network, in addition to its radio broadcast distributed by Citadel Media. Multiple sports talk radio shows, including Mike & Mike, The Herd with Colin Cowherd and Boomer and Carton also are carried on television, saving those networks the burden of having to air encores of sporting events or other paid sports programming which may draw lower audiences. In New Zealand, breakfast programme The AM Show airs on television channel Three and was simulcast on radio station Magic Talk; both networks were owned and operated by MediaWorks New Zealand until December 2020, when Three was sold to Discovery, Inc. In 2022, the programme was rebranded as AM and ceased simulcasting on Magic Talk, becoming a TV-only format.

In professional wrestling, a simulcast happened on 26 March 2001 between WWF Raw is War and WCW Monday Nitro upon WWF's purchase of WCW's assets by WWF's owner, Vince McMahon, to merge the storylines of the two wrestling promotions, which was the last episode of Monday Nitro, but was ultimately revealed that Vince's son, Shane McMahon, is the owner of WCW.

In another case, popular programs will be aired simultaneously on different services in adjacent countries, such as animated sitcom The Simpsons, airing Sunday evenings at 8:00 p.m. (Eastern and Pacific times) on both Fox in the United States and Global (1989 to 2018) and Citytv (2018 to 2021) in Canada and entertainment show Ant & Dec's Saturday Night Takeaway, airing Saturday nights at various times between 7:00 pm and 7:30 pm on ITV in the United Kingdom and Virgin Media One in the Republic of Ireland. "Simulcast" is often a colloquial term for the related Canadian practice of simultaneous substitution (simsub).

Simulcasts are also used for the purposes of television ratings, mainly with awards ceremonies such as the MTV Video Music Awards and the Nickelodeon Kids' Choice Awards where the ceremony airs on other sister channels in the same corporate family. These allow a bulk ratings number to be competed which allows for more homes to be calculated in a final rating, along with removing any in-house competition, with each of the networks carrying the same ceremony and same advertising. Another example is a "roadblock strategy", where a family of networks will air the premiere of a new series, music video or other event such as a telethon at the same time to maximize their audiences. During major breaking news events, a simulcast of the Fox News Channel is aired on the Fox broadcast network and Fox Business Network.

"Live Simulcast" is also used throughout South America for a real-time live broadcasting from the US, where it differs from just a live broadcasting in that, on the former case, the event is being broadcast live while it is happening in real time (e.g. the NFL games), while, the latter,  a show may be a live recording but not necessarily being broadcast in real time of when the event took place (e.g. a live concert recording). Yet, local live productions (football games, for instance) being broadcast in real time in South America are often just called live, without the use of the word simulcast.

Simulcasting of sporting events
In sports, such as American football and baseball, simulcasts are when a single announcer broadcasts play-by-play coverage both over television and radio. The practice was common in the early years of television, but since the 1980s, most teams have used a separate team for television and for radio.

As all NFL television broadcasts are done by the national networks or via cable, there are no regular TV-to-radio football simulcasts.  However, NFL rules require that games airing on cable and satellite networks (ESPN, NFL Network) be simulcast on local over-air TV stations in markets serving the two local teams participating in each game.

Similarly, no current National Basketball Association teams use a simulcast. Al McCoy (Phoenix), Chick Hearn (Los Angeles), Kevin Calabro (Seattle) and Rod Hundley (Utah) were the last NBA team broadcasters to simulcast.

In Major League Baseball, until his retirement in 2016, Vin Scully continued the practice; however, he simulcast only the first three innings of Los Angeles Dodgers games at Dodger Stadium and other National League Western Division parks. As a result of his retirement, no MLB team uses a simulcast, outside of 2020 and 2021 when the Toronto Blue Jays broadcast the audio of the Sportsnet play-by-play over their radio network temporarily due to the team's circumstances, where the team was based out of Buffalo, New York and Dunedin, Florida due to the COVID-19 pandemic preventing inter-border crossings between Canada and the United States.

In the National Hockey League, two teams currently use a simulcast: 
The Buffalo Sabres, with play-by-play announcer Rick Jeanneret or Dan Dunleavy and analyst Rob Ray via MSG Western New York
The Dallas Stars, with play-by-play announcer Josh Bogorad and analyst Daryl Reaugh via Bally Sports Southwest

Simulcasts via satellite can be a challenge, as there is a significant delay because of the distance - nearly  round-trip - involved. Anything involving video compression (and to some extent audio data compression) also has an additional significant delay, which is noticeable when watching local TV stations on direct-broadcast satellites. Even though the process is not instantaneous, this is still considered a simulcast because it is not intentionally stored anywhere.

(Multiplexing—also sometimes called "multicasting"—is something of a reversal of this situation, where multiple program streams are combined into a single broadcast. The two terms are sometimes confused.)

In greyhound racing and horse racing, a simulcast is a broadcast of a greyhound or horse race which allows wagering at two or more sites; the simulcast often involves the transmission of wagering information to a central site, so that all bettors may bet in the same betting pool, as well as the broadcast of the race, or bet from home as they watch on a network such as TVG Network or the Racetrack Television Network.

The San Francisco Giants simulcast with the Oakland Athletics while playing each other on their respective networks (NBC Sports Bay Area and NBC Sports California) and commercials with a mix of broadcasters from both teams. Formerly, the Chicago Cubs and Chicago White Sox also did so when they both were carried by NBC Sports Chicago.

Commonly on cable, sporting events and awards shows often simulcast live across one cable group's entire range of networks, prevening any kind of ratings dilution caused by a sister network airing different programming.

On cable television systems, analog-digital simulcasting (ADS) means that analog channels are duplicated as digital subchannels. Digital tuners are programmed to use the digital subchannel instead of the analog. This allows for smaller, cheaper cable boxes by eliminating the analog tuner and some analog circuitry. On DVRs, it eliminates the need for an MPEG encoder to convert the analog signal to digital for recording. The primary advantage is the elimination of interference, and as analog channels are dropped, the ability to put 10 or more SDTV (or two HDTV, or various other combinations) channels in its place. The primary drawback is the common problem of over-compression (quantity over quality) resulting in fuzzy pictures and pixelation.

In universities with multiple campuses, simulcasting may be used for a single teacher to teach class to students in two or more locations at the same time, using videoconferencing equipment.

In many public safety agencies, simulcast refers to the broadcasting of the same transmission on the same frequency from multiple towers either simultaneously, or offset by a fixed number of microseconds. This allows for a larger coverage area without the need for a large number of channels, resulting in increased spectral efficiency. This comes at the cost of overall poorer voice quality, as multiple sources increase multipath interference significantly, resulting in what is called simulcast distortion.

With some of the latest simulcast control equipment for FM radio networks, the distortion experienced is almost in-audible to the human ear. With the introduction of Line Equalisation Modules and Tone Generation Modules, the phasing advance and lag is so well calculated that the distortion is almost entirely averted.

The Tone Generation Module (or TGM) generates a pilot tone at 3300 Hz which is then sampled by the Line Equalisation Module (or LEM) which each channel on each radio high site has 2 of located back at the main control site. This then determines the phase shift in the signal and adjusts the transmission accordingly such that all the overlap areas in transmission are in phase with each other.

See also 
 Single Channel Simulcast
 Digital distribution, Video on demand and Streaming media: In English language anime distribution, the word "simulcast" is often misused to refer to the online release of a Japanese animated television series during the same period as in Japan.

References 

Broadcast engineering
Radio broadcasting
Television terminology
 
1940s neologisms